Doryssa lamarckiana is a species of freshwater snail with an operculum, an aquatic gastropod mollusk in the family Pachychilidae.

Distribution
Distribution of Doryssa lamarckiana include Venezuela.

References

External links

lamarchiana
Gastropods described in 1870
Molluscs of Venezuela